Eugene Pulliam may refer to:

 Eugene C. Pulliam (1889–1975), American newspaper publisher and businessman
 Eugene S. Pulliam (1914–1999), American publisher of the Indianapolis Star and the Indianapolis News